Bank Gospodarstwa Krajowego (BGK) is a Polish national development bank with headquarters in Warsaw, is a state-owned bank in Poland, operating under a dedicated bill of law. Its main tasks are: support and servicing of export transactions, issuing governmental guarantees, and support of housing.

Founded in 1924 under an initiative of Minister of Treasury Władysław Grabski, its first president was a former Minister of Treasury, Jan Kanty Steczkowski. The bank was involved in Polish international trade, funding of numerous companies and of Polish Central Industrial Region.

After the World War II its activity was gradually phased-out, reactivated starting in 1989.

Headquarters 
The bank's monumental modernistic headquarters was designed by Rudolf Świerczyński. Constructed in 1928–1931, it was recognized as a monument in 1965.

History

Second Polish Republic 

The history of BGK dates back to 1924 when the President of the Republic of Poland, at the initiative of then Prime Minister and Treasury Minister Wladyslaw Grabski, issued a decree establishing BGK. It was created by a merger of three public banks from the Galicia region, the Bank Krajowy, the State Reconstruction Bank and the Credit Institution of Malopolska Cities.
The creation of BGK was a result of Grabski's economic concepts. Despite being opposed to statism in industry and trade, Grabski was at the same time a supporter of strong state banking. The Bank's main tasks included granting long-term loans through issuance of covered, municipal, railway and bank bonds and offering local government loans as well as providing loans to savings institutions and performing all other banking tasks. The Bank had special obligations towards state-owned and local government companies. Securities issued by BGK were guaranteed by the State Treasury.

Bank Gospodarstwa Krajowego, in accordance with its statutory tasks, from the beginning of its existence financially supported the development of Polish economy. BGK was financially involved in all major investments of the Second Polish Republic. Among them is e.g. the seaport and shipyard in Gdynia. One of the forms of BGK's activity in this field were activities undertaken by BGK at the request of the government, aimed at financial protection and modernization of strategic enterprises of the economic and military interests of the state. This became the basis for the creation of the so-called BGK conglomerate, which included enterprises of great importance for the national economy and defense of the country: the Association of Starachowice Mining and Smelting Plants, Grodzisk Chemical Plant, Boruta Chemical Industry, The Association of Potassium Salt Mining and a number of other plants.

Starting from 1936, BGK was included in realization of state investment plan of creating the Central Industrial Region.

The Bank also administered the government's special purpose funds, including the Credit Institution Support Fund, State Construction Fund, State Credit Fund and Labour Fund.

At the turn of the 1920s and 1930s, BGK became one of the biggest banks of inter-war Poland and served as the primary participant in the economic restructuring process.

Between 1928 and 1931, a BGK building designed by Rudolf Swierczynski was constructed in Warsaw's Aleje Jerozolimskie street.

Post-war development 
After World War II, BGK was reactivated with renowned economist Professor Edward Lipski at its helm. In 1948, as a result of a banking reform, BGK was supposed to be an investment bank. Its role during 1948-1989 period was mainly limited to pre-war foreign debt service.

In 1989, BGK resumed it operation as a state-owned bank and as such acted primarily as issue agent for Treasury bonds, offered for the first time in several decades. The Bank's activities focused on the preparation of sub-agent deals for the sale and redemption of bonds, development of accounting and reporting rules and organizing a nationwide sales network.

In December 1997, BGK returned to its pre-war headquarters in Aleje Jerozolimskie in Warsaw.

In modern Poland, the government tasks the Bank with the operation of a number of special purpose funds and programmes (including the National Road Fund, National Housing Fund, Thermomodernisation and Renovation Fund and the Railway Fund).

BGK participates in the implementation of the state's economic objectives. During the economic slowdown, it provides funding for infrastructure investments and thus supports growth of this sector of the economy. It is an important link in the provision of funding and support for areas that are important for the society, such as housing infrastructure, energy efficiency and public utilities. It supports Polish exporters by taking on part of the risk related to trading activities of Polish companies. In collaboration with other financial institutions, BGK improves access to funding for businesses, which translates into lower unemployment and stronger GDP growth.

BGK manages several special purpose funds and a number of governmental programmes. Its mission is to support social and economic growth of Poland and the public finance sector in the performance of its tasks.

Three Seas Initiative Investment Fund 

The twelve members of the Three Seas Initiative met for their first summit in 2016, in Dubrovnik. It is composed of Austria,  Bulgaria, Croatia, Czech Republic, Estonia, Hungary, Latvia, Lithuania, Poland, Romania, Slovakia, and Slovenia.

In 2019, Bank Gospodarstwa Krajowego and Export–Import Bank of Romania established the Three Seas Initiative Investment Fund. It is focusing on projects creating transport, energy and digital infrastructure in the Three Seas region. The aim is to raise up to EUR 3-5 billion.

The Fund will engage, on a commercial basis, in infrastructure projects with a total value of up to EUR 100 billion, while the needs of the Three Seas region have been estimated at over EUR 570 billion.

Presidents 
 Jan Kanty Steczkowski – 1924-1927
 Roman Górecki – 1927–1935, 1936-1941
 Karol Alexandrowicz – 1943-1946
 Edward Lipiński – 1946-1948
 Jan Wojnar – 1948-1949
 Czesław Gawłowski – 1989-1991
 Mariusz Stolarz – 1991-1993
 Danuta Chmielewska – 1993-1996
 Waldemar Nowak – 1996-1997
 Danuta Chmielewska – 1997-1998
 Ryszard Pazura – 1998-2002
 Witold Koziński – 2002-2004
 Andrzej Dorosz – 2004-2006
 Wojciech Kuryłek – 2006-2007
 Ireneusz Fąfara – 2007-2009
 Tomasz Mironczuk – 2009-2011
 Dariusz Daniluk – 2011-2013
 Dariusz Kacprzyk – 2013-2016
 Mirosław Panek – 2016
 Beata Daszyńska-Muzyczka since 2016

See also 
 Korporacja Ubezpieczeń Kredytów Eksportowych
 Polish Investment and Trade Agency (Polska Agencja Inwestycji i Handlu)
 Polish Development Fund

References

Government-owned companies of Poland
Banks of Poland
National development banks
Banks established in 1924
Polish brands